The Dream Theater, located at 629 N. Main St. in Russell, Kansas, is an Art Deco-style theater which was built in 1948.  It was listed on the National Register of Historic Places in 2006.

It was built in c.1948-49 to replace the previous Dream Theater, which had been built as the "Main Street Theater" in 1929, remodeled, and renamed in 1934.  The previous theater was destroyed by fire on April 19, 1947.  The new theater was designed to be "a modern, futurist, up-to-date, fireproof theater that would rival theaters in large cities."

It was designed by architects Robert O. Boller and Dietz Lusk Jr. of Kansas City, Missouri, and is a late example of the Art Deco style.

References

External links

Theatres on the National Register of Historic Places in Kansas
Art Deco architecture in Kansas
Theatres completed in 1948
Russell County, Kansas